Everything in Life is a 1936 British musical film directed by J. Elder Wills and starring Gitta Alpar, Neil Hamilton and Lawrence Grossmith. It was made at Highbury Studios. An opera singer pretends to be poor in order to romantically win over a composer.

Cast
 Gitta Alpar as Rita Bonya  
 Neil Hamilton as Geoffrey Loring  
 Lawrence Grossmith as Lewis Radford  
 H. F. Maltby as Sir Algernon Spindle  
 Gerald Barry as Vere Ponsonby 
 Dorothy Boyd as Miss Winstone  
 Wyn Weaver as William Tewkes 
 Clarissa Selwynne as Matilda Tewkes  
 Bruce Winston as Franz Graumann  
 Vera Bogetti as Carolyn Dexter 
 John Deverell as John

References

Bibliography
 Low, Rachael. Filmmaking in 1930s Britain. George Allen & Unwin, 1985.
 Wood, Linda. British Films, 1927-1939. British Film Institute, 1986.

External links

1936 films
British musical films
British black-and-white films
1936 musical films
Films directed by J. Elder Wills
Films shot at Highbury Studios
1930s English-language films
1930s British films